Karin Wolff Wilson was an American elected official and has served as the mayor of Fairhope, Alabama since November 7, 2016. She was defeated by Sherry Sullivan in the August 25, 2020 municipal election.  Wilson's campaign platform focused on community concerns about the city's comprehensive plan, growth strategies, and maintaining Fairhope's quality of life.

Education
Wilson graduated from Fairhope High School and attended Auburn University, where she earned a degree in  finance.

Business career
Wilson purchased the Page & Palette Bookstore in 1997. The Page & Palette Bookstore is a family-owned business founded in 1968. She has served as president of the Page & Palette Bookstore, Latte Da Coffee Shop, and The Book Cellar Bar & Event Venue, which are all local businesses in Fairhope.

Awards and honors
 Founded Fairhope Local as an educational campaign to promote community benefits of buying local.
 Created the Good Life Foundation, a community organization that promotes education excellence, school programs, civic involvement, cultural development and student achievement.
 Recognized as a Local Hero in Garden & Gun Magazine in 2011.
 Recognized as one of AL.com's 2014 11 Coastal Alabama Leaders

References

Living people
People from Fairhope, Alabama
Mayors of places in Alabama
Year of birth missing (living people)